Charles John Brown   (born 13 October 1959) is an American prelate of the Roman Catholic Church who has been serving as an apostolic nuncio since 2012.  He is currently the apostolic nuncio to the Philippines. Before entering the diplomatic service of the Holy See, Brown worked at the Congregation for the Doctrine of the Faith (CDF).

Biography

Early life and education 
Brown was born on October 13, 1959, in the East Village neighborhood of Manhattan, New York City, when it was a mostly Jewish neighborhood. He later said his family "were pretty much the only gentile family in the apartment block" as he grew up as the oldest of six children. When he was five, the family moved to Rye, New York and in 1971 to Windham, New York. His family's roots are in Ireland and Germany."

Brown earned a Bachelor of History degree at the University of Notre Dame, a Master of Theology degree at University of Oxford, and a Master of Medieval Studies degree at the University of Toronto. He then entered the seminary and earned a Master of Divinity degree at Saint Joseph's Seminary in Yonkers, New York.

Priesthood 
Brown was ordained a priest for the Archdiocese of New York by Cardinal John O'Connor on May 13, 1989 in St. Patrick's Cathedral in Manhattan.  From 1989 to 1991, he served as was assistant priest at St. Brendan's Parish in The Bronx, New York City. In 1991, Cardinal O'Connor sent Brown to study in Rome. He earned a Doctor of Sacred Theology degree at the Pontifical University St. Anselmo. In 1994, Brown stayed in Rome to join the CDF staff, where he remained until 2012.

Pope John Paul II appointed Brown as a chaplain of his holiness on May 6, 2000.  He was named as adjunct secretary of the International Theological Commission in September 2009. .

Apostolic nuncio to Ireland
Brown was named titular archbishop of Aquileia and apostolic nuncio to Ireland on November 26, 2011.  He was consecrated by Pope Benedict XVI on January 6, 2012. Brown said Cardinal Tarcisio Bertone had told him that Pope Benedict had asked for his transfer from the Roman Curia to the diplomatic service of the Holy See, though Brown had not trained at the Pontifical Ecclesiastical Academy like most nuncios. Brown worked closely with Pope Benedict for a decade at the CDF.

Archbishop Diarmuid Martin described Brown as "much more focused on theology than relations between church and state". Archbishop Timothy M. Dolan  said that Brown was "young, vibrant, very theologically savvy but pastorally sensitive".

In January 2014, Brown praised the decision of the Government of Ireland to re-open the Irish Embassy to the Holy See, though officials said it was expected to operate on "a smaller scale", perhaps as "a one-man operation".

"Green shoots"
Brown described the rebirth as the spring after 20 years of winter, saying he saw "green shoots." "You see a renewed enthusiasm among young Catholics in Ireland now," said Brown, who was appointed as papal ambassador in November 2011, at the cusp of the church's troubles stemming from a long-standing period of unreported clergy sexual abuse. The new generation of Catholics, some of whom are studying for the priesthood at Saint Patrick's College, the national seminary in Maynooth, or the Pontifical Irish College in Rome, will "lead the Church forward into the next decade," he said. Young Catholics represent what is best in the tradition of the Second Vatican Council, "the idea of communicating the ancient unchanging faith in a new, vibrant and attractive way," he said.

However, in The Tablet, Fr Sean McDonagh wrote: "Figures on the bishops' own website show the age profile of Irish priests. Over 65 per cent of Irish priests are aged 55 or over. There are only two priests under the age of 40 in the Archdiocese of Dublin. A priest in Killala diocese, Fr Brendan Hoban, pointed out that there has been a priest and celebration of the Eucharist in his parish –Moygownagh – since the eighth century. But he believes he will be that last priest in that parish. At the moment there is a priest in every parish in Killala. Within 20 years there will be seven serving 22 parishes spread out over a wide area. The situation is much same in other dioceses. The research points out that to maintain the status quo would mean ordaining 82 priests each year. The reality is that 20 students entered Maynooth in September 2013. It is likely that only 10 or 12 will be ordained in 2020".

"Caricature"
In August 2015, Brown warned that the church's emphasis on a handful of social issues such as abortion, same-sex marriage and contraception allowed for a view of the church that was nothing more than "a caricature", ignoring its spirituality and history, its vision of eternal life. He also stated that the Irish bishops did "an excellent job" in their unsuccessful campaign against the legalization of same-sex marriage in Ireland before May 2015 referendum on the issue.

Later appointments
On March 9, 2017, Pope Francis appointed Brown as apostolic nuncio to Albania. On September 28, 2020, Pope Francis appointed him as apostolic nuncio to the Philippines.

See also
 List of heads of the diplomatic missions of the Holy See
American Catholic bishops serving outside the United States

References

External links
 

Apostolic Nuncios to Ireland
Apostolic Nuncios to Albania
Apostolic Nuncios to the Philippines
Officials of the Roman Curia
Catholic Church sexual abuse scandals in Ireland
21st-century American Roman Catholic titular archbishops
People of the Roman Catholic Archdiocese of New York
University of Notre Dame alumni
University of Toronto alumni
Alumni of the University of Oxford
Pontifical Atheneum of St. Anselm alumni
1959 births
Living people
Religious leaders from New York (state)
Diplomats of the Holy See